The Women's junior road race of the 2014 UCI Road World Championships took place in and around Ponferrada, Spain on 26 September 2014.

In a sprint finish of some eighteen riders, defending champion Amalie Dideriksen of Denmark was able to retain her title, repeating the feat of Great Britain pair Nicole Cooke in 2000 and 2001, and Lucy Garner in 2011 and 2012. Dideriksen out-sprinted Italy's Sofia Bertizzolo, the European champion, for the gold medal, with Agnieszka Skalniak of Poland taking the bronze medal.

Qualification

All National Federations were allowed to enter eight riders for the race, with a maximum of four riders to start. In addition to this number, the outgoing World Champion and the current continental champions were also able to take part.

Course
The race was held on the same circuit as the other road races and consisted of four laps.

The first  were flat, after which the climb to Alto de Montearenas started, with an average gradient of 8%. After a few hundred metres the ascent flattened and the remaining  were at an average gradient of 3.5%. Next was a descent, with the steepest point after  at a 16% negative gradient.

Schedule
All times are in Central European Time (UTC+1).

Participating nations
93 cyclists from 35 nations took part in the women's junior road race. The numbers of cyclists per nation are shown in parentheses.

  Australia (3)
  Austria (2)
  Belgium (4)
  Brazil (2)
  Canada (4)
  Colombia (2)
  Czech Republic (2)
  Denmark (2)
  Egypt (2)
  Estonia (1)
  France (4)
  Germany (4)
  Great Britain (4)
  Ireland (1)
  Italy (5)
  Japan (2)
  Kazakhstan (4)
  Latvia (1)
  Lithuania (3)
  Mauritius (1)
  Mexico (3)
  Netherlands (4)
  Poland (4)
  Romania (1)
  Russia (4)
  Serbia (1)
  Slovakia (1)
  Slovenia (1)
  South Africa (3)
  Spain (4) (host)
  Sweden (3)
  Switzerland (3)
  Turkey (3)
  United States (4)
  Uzbekistan (1)

Prize money
The UCI assigned premiums for the top 3 finishers with a total prize money of €3,450.

Final classification

References

Women's junior road race
UCI Road World Championships – Women's junior road race
2014 in women's road cycling